Stockland Shellharbour (previously known as Shellharbour Square) is a large indoor/outdoor shopping centre in the Shellharbour City Centre of the Illawarra region.

Transport 
Stockland Shellharbour has bus connections to Barrack Point, Oak Flats, Unanderra and Wollongong, as well as the local surrounding area. The majority of its bus services are located on Lake Entrance Road and Wattle Road.

Stockland Shellharbour has multi level car parks with 3,607 spaces.

History 
Shellharbour Square opened in November 1982 and featured Kmart, Coles New World, Franklins, Best & Less, W. Waters and Son hardwares. and 96 speciality stores. The centre was owned by Girvan Corporation Ltd who purchased and developed the centre on former public housing land.

In November 1988 GIO acquired Shellharbour Square for $63 million. Shellharbour Square underwent a redevelopment which saw the centre expand in the W. Waters and Son hardware space and the addition of Target. In 2002 Franklins closed its store and was taken over by Bi-Lo. Bi-Lo closed in 2006 and was replaced by Harris Scarfe.

In December 2010 Stockland commenced construction on the $330 million redevelopment of Stockland Shellharbour. The redevelopment involved the expansion and partial demolition of the centre. The expansion doubled the size of the centre and involved the relocation of Kmart and Target. This development included the addition of a new city square, new plaza entrance on vacant land to the southwest of existing centre, alfresco dining precinct, community stage, child play areas and a multi-function space used for passive recreation and small community activities.

Stockland Shellharbour had its grand opening on 18 May 2013. This included the opening of a two level Myer department store, Harris Scarfe, Woolworths, JB Hi-Fi and 220 specialty stores including a new relocated Kmart and Target.

Tenants 
Stockland Shellharbour has 81,880m² of floor space. The major retailers include Myer, Harris Scarfe, Kmart, Target, Coles, Woolworths, Cotton On, JB Hi-Fi and Timezone.

References

External links 
Stockland Shellharbour Official Website

Shopping centres in New South Wales
Shopping malls established in 1982
1982 establishments in Australia
Buildings and structures in Wollongong
City of Shellharbour